Zamil Industrial Investment Co., better known as Zamil Industrial is a publicly listed company based in Dammam, Saudi Arabia. Zamil Industrial is engaged in the development of various materials and equipment for use in the construction industry. Zamil Group Holding Company owns 60% of Zamil Industrial stocks, while the remaining share is owned by other Saudi Arabian and Gulf Investors. It is listed on the Saudi Stock Exchange (Tadawul). According to Forbes Middle East, Zamil Industrial was among the top 500 companies in the Arab world in 2014.

History
Originally founded as a small-size trading and real estate business by the late Sheikh Abdullah Al Hamad Al Zamil (1897-1961) in the 1930s, his sons expanded the business in the 1970s through importing and distributing air conditioners, eventually founding their company in 1974.

In 1998, Zamil Industrial was formed as a joint-stock company by merging companies which were previously fully owned by their parent company, Zamil Group Holding Company. In 2002, Zamil Industrial Investment Co. became a public company and was listed on the Saudi Stock Exchange (Tadawul) under the symbol: 2240. Through mergers and acquisitions, Zamil Industrial has grown and expanded into many countries around the world.

Subsidiaries 
Zamil Industrial Investment Co. owns the whole stake of the following companies, among other subsidiaries:

 Zamil Steel Pre-Engineered Buildings Company - Saudi Arabia
 Zamil Air Conditioners Holding Company -  Saudi Arabia
 Arabian Stonewool Insulation Company - Saudi Arabia
 Zamil Industrial Investment Company - UAE
 Zamil Steel Buildings Company - Egypt
 Zamil Steel Buildings (Shanghai) Company - China
 Zamil Steel Buildings India Private Ltd. - India

References

External links
 

Manufacturing companies established in 1998
Companies listed on Tadawul
Companies of Saudi Arabia
Manufacturing companies of Saudi Arabia
Companies based in Dammam
Saudi Arabian companies established in 1998